Jeth Troy Utanes Rosario (born January 20, 1992) is a Filipino professional basketball player for the Blackwater Bossing of the Philippine Basketball Association (PBA).

College and amateur career
Rosario played for two years at Technological Institute of the Philippines. He left TIP to focus on his stint for the RP Youth Team then-coached by NU Bulldogs coach Eric Altamirano. Then he suited for the NU Bulldogs after transferring from TIP.  In his final season with the Bulldogs, he averaged 12.3 points and 8.6 rebounds per game, as his team made history by winning their first championship since 1954.

After his college career was over, Rosario suited up for the Hapee Fresh Fighters in the PBA D-League, where he teamed up with fellow college standouts and future draft batchmates Chris Newsome, Baser Amer, Scottie Thompson and Garvo Lanete.

Professional career

TNT Tropang Giga franchise (2015–2022)
Rosario was drafted second overall by the Mahindra Enforcer in the 2015 PBA draft. Two days later, the Enforcers shipped his rights to the Talk 'N Text Tropang Texters via a complicated three-team which also involved TNT's sister team, NLEX Road Warriors. On August 27, 2015, both he and #1 pick Moala Tautuaa signed maximum three-year rookie contracts with the Talk 'N Text Tropang Texters worth ₱8.5 million.

Blackwater Bossing (2022–present)
On September 19, 2022, Rosario was traded to the Blackwater Bossing in a three-team trade involving Blackwater, TNT, and NLEX Road Warriors.

PBA career statistics

As of the end of 2022–23 season

Season-by-season averages
 
|-
| align=left | 
| align=left | TNT
| 39 ||	25.7 || .471 || .365 || .632 || 5.4 || .8 || .3 || .2 || 11.9
|-
| align=left | 
| align=left | TNT
| 56 || 23.4 || .445 || .267 || .704 || 6.0 || 1.0 || .4 || .4 || 9.8
|-
| align=left | 
| align=left | TNT
| 35 || 27.3 || .463 || .347 || .615 || 7.1 || 1.0 || .4 || .4 || 12.7
|-
| align=left | 
| align=left | TNT
| 50 || 31.7 || .489 || .364 || .657 || 5.5 || 1.1 || .6 || .2 || 15.4
|-
| align=left | 
| align=left | TNT
| 22 || 30.7 || .356 || .242 || .633 || 7.4 || 1.9 || .4 || .4 || 10.9
|-
| align=left | 
| align=left | TNT
| 33 || 25.7 || .482 || .230 || .681 || 6.4 || .8 || .3 || .3 || 10.2
|-
| align=left rowspan=2| 
| align=left | TNT
| rowspan=2|30 || rowspan=2|26.2 || rowspan=2|.424 || rowspan=2|.262 || rowspan=2|.531 || rowspan=2|4.8 || rowspan=2|1.2 || rowspan=2|.2 || rowspan=2|.6 || rowspan=2|10.4
|-
| align=left | Blackwater
|-class=sortbottom
| align=center colspan=2 | Career
| 265 || 27.0 || .454 || .311 || .654 || 6.0 || 1.1 || .3 || .4 || 11.7

International career
As a member of the Gilas Cadets, Rosario saw action in the 2015 Southeast Asian Games and the 2015 SEABA Championship, where his team won gold medals on both occasions.  He was also included in the Gilas Pilipinas 3.0 pool that competed in the 2015 FIBA Asia Championship.  He saw action in the 2015 William Jones Cup but did not make it to the Final 12 roster for 2015 FIBA Asia Championship.

Player profile
Rosario has the height and build to play as a power forward or even a center and he’s also mobile and athletic enough to be a small forward. He has also developed a decent outside shot extending to the three-point area which makes him a tough cover considering that he can also put the ball on the floor and score on the low block.

Personal life
He is the older brother of CJ Rosario, a former member of the Arellano University's women's volleyball team, now playing professionally for the Petron Tri-Activ Spikers in the Philippine Super Liga. Like his younger sister, Rosario also played volleyball and has even represented Cagayan Valley in the Palarong Pambansa before converting to basketball.

Troy Rosario is married to Michelle Aguas. They have two daughters.

References

External links

1992 births
Living people
2019 FIBA Basketball World Cup players
Basketball players from Metro Manila
Blackwater Bossing players
Competitors at the 2015 Southeast Asian Games
Competitors at the 2017 Southeast Asian Games
Competitors at the 2019 Southeast Asian Games
Competitors at the 2021 Southeast Asian Games
FIBA 3x3 World Tour players
Filipino men's 3x3 basketball players
Filipino men's basketball players
NU Bulldogs basketball players
People from Mandaluyong
Philippine Basketball Association All-Stars
Philippines men's national basketball team players
Philippines national 3x3 basketball team players
Power forwards (basketball)
Southeast Asian Games gold medalists for the Philippines
Southeast Asian Games medalists in basketball
Southeast Asian Games silver medalists for the Philippines
Terrafirma Dyip draft picks
TNT Tropang Giga players